Walker Hill is a ghost town in Greenbrier County, West Virginia, United States. Walker Hill was located immediately north of Orient Hill. Walker Hill appeared on USGS maps as late as 1935.

References

Geography of Greenbrier County, West Virginia
Ghost towns in West Virginia